The psychological impacts of climate change on the Earth's inhabitants include emotional states such as eco-anxiety, ecological grief and eco-anger. While unpleasant, such emotions are often not harmful, and can be rational responses to the degradation of the natural world, motivating adaptive action. Other effects of climate change on mental health, such as post-traumatic stress disorder (PTSD), can be more dangerous. In the 21st century, academics, medical professionals and various other actors are seeking to understand these impacts, to assist in their relief, make more accurate predictions, and to assist efforts to mitigate and adapt to global warming.

There are three broad channels by which climate change affects people's mental state: directly, indirectly or via awareness. The direct channel includes stress related conditions being caused by exposure to extreme weather events. The indirect pathway can be via disruption to economic and social activities, such as when an area of farmland is less able to produce food. And the third channel can be of mere awareness of the climate change threat, even by individuals who are not otherwise affected by it. There are many exceptions, but generally it is people in developing countries who are more exposed to the direct impact and economic disruption caused by climate changes. Whereas recently identified climate related psychological conditions like eco-anxiety, which can result just from awareness of the threat, tend to affect people across the planet.

The psychological effects of climate change are investigated within the field of climate psychology. Various non-clinical treatments, group work options, internet based support forums, and self-help books are available for people suffering from less severe psychological conditions. Some of the psychological impacts require no form of treatment at all, and can even be positive: for example, worry about climate change can be positively related to information-seeking and to a sense of being able to influence such problems. The psychological effects of climate also receive attention from governments and others involved in creating public policy, by various campaigning groups and NGOs, and by private sector firms.

Pathways

There are three causal pathways by which climate change causes psychological effects: directly, indirectly or via awareness (or "psychosocial").  In some cases, people may be affected via more than one pathway at once.

There are three broad channels by which climate change affects people's mental state: directly, indirectly or via awareness. The direct channel includes stress-related conditions being caused by exposure to extreme weather events, such as cyclones and wildfires, causing conditions such as PTS and anxiety disorder. However, psychological impacts can also occur through less intense forms of climate change such as through temperatures rising leading to increased anger and aggression. The indirect pathway occurs via disruption to economic and social activities, such as when an area of farmland becomes infertile due to desertification or a decrease in tourism due to damage to the landscape. This can lead to increased stress, depression and other psychological conditions such as anxiety. And the third channel can be of mere awareness of the climate change threat, even by individuals who are not otherwise affected by it. This can be, for instance, feeling intimidated by the threats to food and water security, posed by climate change which can lead to war. There are many exceptions, but generally, it is people in developing countries who are more exposed to economic disruption caused by climate change. Whereas recently identified climate-related psychological conditions like eco-anxiety, which can result just from awareness of the threat, tend to affect people across the planet.

Direct impact
Exposure to extreme weather events, such as wildfires, hurricanes and floods, can cause various emotional disorders. Most commonly this is short term stress, from which people can often soon make a rapid recovery. But sometimes chronic conditions set in, especially among those who have been exposed to multiple events, such as post traumatic stress, somatoform disorder or long term anxiety. A swift response by authorities to restore a sense of order and security can substantially reduce the risk of any long term psychological impact for most people. Though individuals who already suffered from mental ill health, especially psychosis, can need intensive care, which can be challenging to deliver if local mental health services were disrupted by the extreme weather.

The less extreme direct manifestations of climate change can also have direct psychological effects. The single most well studied linkage between weather and human behavior is that between temperature and aggression, which has been investigated in lab settings, by historical study, and extensive field work. Various reviews conclude that high temperatures cause people to become bad tempered, leading to increased physical violence, especially in areas where there are mixed ethnic groups. There have been exceptions, such as in modern cities where air conditioning is widely available. Also, there has been academic dispute regarding the degree to which the excess violence is caused by climate change, as opposed to natural temperature variability.  The psychological effects of unusually low temperatures, which climate change can cause in some parts of the world, is much less well studied. Though available evidence suggests that unlike unusual heat, it does not lead to increased aggression.

Indirect pathway

In several parts of the world, climate change significantly impacts people's financial income, for example by reducing agricultural output, or by making an area unattractive for tourism. This can cause significant stress, which in turn can lead to depression, suicidal ideation, and other negative psychological conditions. Consequences can be especially severe if financial stress is coupled with significant disruption to social life, such as relocation to camps. For example, in the aftermath of Hurricane Katrina, the suicide rate for the general population rose by about 300%, but for those who were displaced and had to move into trailer parks, it rose by over 1400%. Effective government interventions, similar to those used to relief the stress from a financial crisis, can alleviate the negative conditions caused by such disruption, however this is sometimes not easy, especially in some of the less prosperous countries in the global south.

Indirect effects on mental health can occur via impacts on physical health. Physical health and mental health have a reciprocal relationship, so any climate change related effect that affects physical health can potentially indirectly affect mental health too. Environmental disruption, such as the loss of bio-diversity, or even the loss of inanimate environmental features like sea-ice, cultural landscapes, or historic heritage can also cause negative psychological responses, such as ecological grief or solastalgia.

Awareness
Simply knowing about the risks posed by climate change, even from those not otherwise affected by it, can cause long lasting psychological conditions, such as anxiety and other forms of distress.  This can especially affect children, and has been compared to nuclear anxiety which occurred during the Cold War. Conditions such as eco-anxiety are very rarely severe enough to require clinical treatment. While unpleasant and thus classified as negative, such conditions have been described as valid rational responses to the reality of climate change.

Mental health

Climate change specific conditions
As climate change becomes increasingly threatening to both the biosphere and human livelihoods, the feelings aroused in response are a focus for exploration. Strong, difficult emotions such as grief, mourning, guilt, feelings of loss and anxiety are common responses to the threats posed by climate change. These various emotions have been collectively referred to in the literature as climate distress. Climate change is associated with increased frequency and severity of extreme weather events, and the impacts of discrete events such as natural disasters on mental health has been demonstrated through decades of research showing increased levels of PTSD, depression, anxiety, substance abuse, and even domestic violence following the experience of storms.

Many of these emotions have been studied independently in relation to climate change. Feelings of loss have been identified as being multi-faceted, and can originate in anticipation of loss soon to occur, as well as actual destruction. The corresponding ‘anticipatory mourning’ has been explored. The feelings of grief and distress in response to ecological destruction have elsewhere been termed ’solastalgia’ and the response to pollution of the local environment has been termed ‘environmental melancholia’.

However feelings in response to climate change and its broader ramifications can be undeveloped or not fully recognized. This can result in unconscious feelings of despair and unease, particularly in young people and those attending therapy. This makes it difficult to give name to what one is feeling, so it is generally termed as eco-anxiety- particularly when this negative effect takes on more intense forms such as sleeping disorders and ruminative thinking. Rather than see eco-anxiety as a pathology requiring treatment Bednarek has suggested that it be construed as an adaptive, healthy response.

It is often difficult to conceptualize emotions in response to the unseen or intangible aspects of climate change. Theoretical approaches have suggested this is due to climate change being part of a greater construct than human cognition can fully comprehend, known as a ‘hyperobject’. One of the techniques used by climate psychologists to engage with such ‘unthought knowns’ and their unconscious, unexplored, emotional implications is ‘social dreaming’.

Awareness of climate change and its destructive impact, happening in both the present and future, is often very overwhelming. Literature investigating how individuals and society respond to crisis and disaster found that when there was space to process and reflect on emotional experiences, these increased emotions were adaptive. Furthermore, this then led to growth and resilience. Doppelt suggested ‘transformational resilience’ as a property of social systems, in which adversities are catalysts for new meaning and direction in life, leading to changes that increase both individual and community wellbeing above previous levels.

Climate anxiety (eco-anxiety)

Eco-grief

Anthropological perspective on climate psychology
Climate change has devastating effects on Indigenous peoples' psychological wellbeing as it impacts them directly and indirectly. As their lifestyles are often closely linked to the land, climate change directly impacts their physical health and financial stability in quantifiable ways. There is also a concerning correlation between severe mental health issues among Indigenous peoples worldwide and environmental changes. The connection and value Indigenous cultures ascribe to land means that damage to or separation from it, directly impacts mental health. For many, their country is interwoven with psychological aspects such as their identity, community and rituals. This interconnectedness informs a holistic perspective of health which requires balance and spiritual connection to the environment, both of which climate change threatens and Western climate actors do not fully understand.

Inadequate government responses which neglect Indigenous knowledge further worsen negative psychological effects linked to climate change. This produces the risk of cultural homogenization due to global adaptation efforts to climate change and the disruption of cultural traditions due to forced relocation. Countries with lower socio-economic status and minority groups in high socio-economic areas are disproportionately affected by the climate crisis. This has created environmental refugees due to worsening environmental conditions and catastrophic climate events.

Changes in cultural practice and social behavior occurred along with the intensifying climate crisis. Indigenous culture is one example of this shift as the human body embodies the surrounding physical environment. Understanding how these cultural shifts in the climate crisis influence mental health is essential in creating and providing appropriate support. Anthropologists provide an essential tool for understanding the implications of the climate crisis on human health. The ‘environmental body' expands on Scheper-Hughes and Lock theory of the ‘three bodies' – the phenomenological body, the body politic, and the symbolically lived body social. It is now necessary to understand mental health, not just as a product of biomedical imbalance, but as a result of the climate crisis. The hegemonic ideology that prioritizes economic expansion drastically affects mental wellbeing and must be brought to light and challenged. The effects will only intensify over time as unpredictable environmental disasters worsen. Due to the extensive impacts of climate change on Indigenous mental health, it is crucial for Indigenous perspectives to be carefully considered and increasingly incorporated in the field of climate psychology.

Other
Other climate specific psychological impacts are less well studied than eco-anxiety. They include eco-depression, eco-anger, and states of denial or numbness, which can be brought on by too much exposure to alarmist presentation of the climate threat. A study that used confirmatory factor analysis to separate out the effects of eco-anxiety, eco-depression and eco-anger, found that eco-anger is the best for the person's wellbeing, and also good for motivating participation in both collective and individual action to mitigate climate change. A separate 2021 report found that eco-anger was significantly more common among young people. A 2021 review of literature found that emotional responses to crisis can be adaptive when the individual has the capacity and support to process and reflect on this emotion. In these cases, individuals are able to grow from their experiences and support others. In the context of climate change, this capacity for deep reflection is necessary to navigate the emotional challenges that both individuals and societies face.

Impacts on specific groups 

People express differing intensities of concern and grief about climate change depending on their worldview, with those holding egoistic (defined as people who mostly care about oneself and their health and wellbeing), social-altruistic (defined as people who express concern for others in their community like future generations, friends, family and general public) and biospheric (defined as people who are concerned about environmental aspects like plants and animals) views differing markedly. People who belong to the biospheric group expressed the most concern about ecological stress/grief i.e., a form of grief related to worries about the state of the world's environment, and engage in ecological coping, – ecological coping includes connection to community, expression of sorrow and grief, shifting focus to controllable aspects of climate change and being close to nature  – people who belonged to the social-altruistic group engaged in ecological coping but did not express ecological stress.

Communities of color
Communities of color are disproportionately affected by climate change. "The impacts of climate change that we are feeling today, from extreme heat to flooding to severe storms, are expected to get worse, and people least able to prepare and cope are disproportionately exposed," said EPA Administrator Michael S. Regan. This has short- and long-term effects on physical and mental health. It is important to recognize how environmentalism and racism are intertwined—how the repercussions of slavery and colonialism and continuous police brutality still play a key role in climate change in communities of color. The response to eco-anxiety is focused on the dominant groups in society and neglects the marginalized communities. According to Mental Health America, 17% of Black people and 23% of Native Americans live with a mental illness.

Research has shown that communities of color are less likely to have access to mental health services, less likely to seek out treatment, and more likely to receive low or poor quality of care. This is due to an overwhelming amount of racial, structural, and cultural barriers these communities face. Eco-anxiety is affecting the majority of young adults because they have grown up with climate change and see the impacts it has on them locally. There are very few resources for communities of color to help them cope with eco-anxiety. Researchers recommend talking with a local therapist, reconnecting with nature, and focusing on positive news of climate change. Many minority and low-income communities do not have the same access to green spaces or playgrounds compared to suburban communities. Studies have shown the positive impact that physical activity can have on mental health, but once again they do not have access to this resource.

Children 

Children and young adults are the most vulnerable to climate change impacts. Many of the climate change impacts which affect children's physical health also lead to psychological and mental health consequences. Children who live in geographic locations that are most susceptible to the impacts of climate change, and/or with weaker infrastructure and fewer supports and services suffer the worst impacts.

Even though children and young adults are the most vulnerable group regarding impacts of climate change, they have received far less research focus as compared to adults. The World Health Organization states that more than 88% of the existing burden of disease attributable to climate change occurs in children younger than 5 years. The impacts of climate change on children include them being at a high risk of mental health consequences like PTSD, depression, anxiety, phobias, sleep disorders, attachment disorders, and substance abuse. These conditions can lead to problems with emotion regulation, cognition, learning, behavior, language development, and academic performance.

A 2018 study argued that it was crucial to gather information about how children are psychologically affected by climate change because of three major reasons:

 Children will bear a larger burden of the negative consequences of climate change over their lifetimes, and hence, society needs to know how to reduce these impacts and protect them; 
 They are the next leaders of society and how they are responding psychologically now has importance for their current and future decision-making; 
 They will need the capacity to adapt to a climate-changed world, including a rapid transition to a low-carbon economy psychologically and physically and they will require particular knowledge, attitudes, and attributes to facilitate this adaptation.

Adolescent mental health 
Mental health is a state of well-being where an individual can recognize their abilities, handle daily stresses of life, productively work, and able to contribute to their community. There are a multitude of mental illnesses that affect everyone differently. 
Increased attention to Climate Change has increased global awareness of the climate crisis, and this awareness comes with a few downfalls. Lack of political advocacy and change, with an increase in media attention, has brought upon ecological grief, which has had particular impacts on adolescent mental health.

Ecological grief is defined as the psychological reaction to loss caused by climate change. Climate change affects adolescents differently and in a multitude of ways. Many of these ways intersect as each adolescent processes their trauma and distress. Adolescents with pre-existing mental illnesses experience an elevated risk of ecological grief and distress.

While these feelings are not directly harmful to the adolescent's physical health and conditions, they are unpleasant and a rising issue. Ecological grief, distress, anxiety, and anger are the most popular emotions sparked among adolescents. Psychologists, specifically climate psychologists, are experiencing difficulties in originating the source of these emotions, and methods to aid those in need and prevent those not as affected.

Direct Effects 
More Information: Effects of climate change

Mental health can be both directly and indirectly impacted by climate change. Direct impacts include trauma-related events, such as dislocation from climate-change induced natural disasters, such as flooding or fire, losing friends and family, or other traumatic events.

Many people exposed to climate-related disasters experience mental health effects. These effects commonly vary from post-traumatic stress disorder, depression, and generalized anxiety disorder. These often occur simultaneously, as well as individually.

Physical health can be severely impacted by climate change. If one's physical health deteriorates due to climate crisis-related problems, this can also be seen as a direct effect. Climate change and infectious diseases are a dangerous combination. Climate change exacerbates existing challenges in managing infectious diseases. Spread, contamination, and variants are all of the concern regarding these illnesses and diseases. The deterioration of one's physical health can also lead to a deterioration in their mental health.

Indirect Effects 
Indirect effects of climate change on mental health happen much more frequently and impact a wider range of adolescents. Climate change affects everyone, their friends, their families, and their communities differently. Each individual's environment will impact for drastic the indirect effect has on the adolescent.

Adolescents are aware and cognitive of their surroundings and what is happening around the world relating to climate change. However, they are still young, learning, and growing. Their brains are not fully developed and they take in a lot of information. Loads of negative information, like climate change, will negatively impact them and their development.

Being forced to move, or displacement is becoming more common as the climate crisis rises. Forced displacement may be caused by natural disasters, reduction of food or food security, famine, water scarcity, or other environmental impacts. This displacement alone evokes feelings of grief and loss by being forced to move from a place of comfort to someplace unknown. Reduction of food, famine and water scarcity will indirectly impact an adolescent's health by invoking fear and anxiety, as well as grief and loss.

As an adolescent, relationships are important. Displacement can put strains on an adolescent's social relationships, as well as prevent them from further developing their social skills and relationships. Community conflict can also indirectly impact an adolescent's mental health. The community may experience conflicting views on how to approach climate change, climate change methods, and climate change awareness. Surrounded by negative emotions, and situations can heavily way on a developing adolescent. They may not want to personally experience this conflict with others and pull back from social interactions. They may possess different ideas, but struggle to get someone to listen due to their age. Feelings of hopelessness, helplessness, and fear become prevalent.

High-Risk Factors 
There is a multitude of factors relating to climate change that can impact an adolescent's mental health.

The geographic location of which the adolescent resides has a large impact on the risk of their mental health. Located in a first-world country, the environmental impacts will be much more prevalent and noticeable.

An adolescent communities reliance on the natural environment is also a high-risk factor. If their community relies heavily on good soil for agriculture, a large abundance of wildlife, and reliable water sources, they may see the effects more drastically, leading to the impact on their mental health.

Preexisting mental illness is a high-risk factor for adolescents. If the adolescent already struggles with mental illness, the distress caused by climate change will only worsen it.

Adolescents who are economically disadvantaged are at risk for mental health problems relating to climate change. Adolescents with less money living on their own, or living in a home that is not economically gifted, may be more susceptible to the damages done to the world including food and water sources. They cannot individually contribute. This may look like no more single-use plastics or driving electric vehicles. Feelings of guilt and anxiety could potentially arise or worsen. If a natural disaster were to occur, they might not have the fundings or the resources to live peacefully or survive.

Positive impacts
While most studies on the psychological impact of climate change finds negative effects, positive impacts are also possible. Direct experience of the negative effects of climate change may lead to positive personal change.  For some individuals, experiencing environmental events such as flooding have resulted in greater psychological salience and concern for climate change, which in turn predicts intentions, behaviors, and support for policy in response to climate change . A potential example of positive impact via the indirect channel would be financial benefits for the minority of farmers who could enjoy increased crop yields. While the overall effects of climate change on agriculture are predicted to be strongly negative, some crops in certain areas are predicted to benefit.

At a personal level, emotions like worry and anxiety are a normal, if uncomfortable, part of life. They can be seen as part of a defense system that identifies threats and deals with them. From this perspective, anxiety can be useful in motivating people to seek information and take action on a problem.  Anxiety and worry are more likely to be associated with engagement when people feel that they can do things.  Feelings of agency can be strengthened by including people in participatory decision-making.  Problem-focused and meaning-focused coping skills can also be promoted.  Problem-focused coping involves information gathering and trying to find out what you personally can do.  Meaning-focused coping involves behaviors such as identifying positive information, focusing on constructive sources of hope, and trusting that other people are also doing their part.  A sense of agency, coping skills, and social support are all important in building general resilience. Education may benefit from a focus around emotional awareness and the development of sustainable emotion-regulation strategies.

For some individuals, the increased engagement caused by the shared struggle against climate change reduces social isolation and loneliness.  At a community level, learning about the science of climate change, and taking collective action in response to the threat, can increase altruism and social cohesion, strengthen social bonds, and improve resilience. Such positive social impact is generally associated only with communities that had somewhat high social cohesion in the first place, prompting community leaders to act to improve social resiliency before climate-related disruption becomes too severe.

History

Efforts to understand the psychological impacts of climate change have antecedents in work from the 20th century and even earlier, to understand reactions to the changing physical and social environment that arose from changes such as the industrial revolution. Empirical investigation of psychological impacts specifically related to climate change began in the late 20th century, and became more frequent in the first decade of the 21st. From the early 2010s, psychologists were increasingly calling on each other to contribute to the understanding of psychological impacts from climate change. While psychologists had almost zero involvement in the first five IPCC reports, at least five will be contributing to the IPCC Sixth Assessment Report, which should be fully published by 2022. As of 2020, the discipline of climate psychology had grown to include many subfields. Climate psychologists are working with the United nations, with national and local governments, with corporations, NGOs and individuals.

Mitigation efforts
Psychologists have increasingly been assisting the worldwide community in facing the "diabolically"  difficult challenge of organizing effective climate change mitigation efforts. Much work has been done on how to best communicate climate related information so that it has positive psychological impact, leading to people engaging in the problem, rather than evoking psychological defenses like denial, distance or a numbing sense of doom.  As well as advising on the method of communication, psychologists have investigated the difference it make when the right sort of person is doing the communication – for example, when addressing American conservatives, climate related messages have been shown to be received more positively if delivered by former military officers. Various people who are not primarily psychologists have also been advising on psychological matters related to climate change. For example, Christiana Figueres and Tom Rivett-Carnac, who led the efforts to organize the unprecedentedly successful 2015 Paris Agreement, have since campaigned to spread the view that a "stubborn optimism" mindset should ideally be part of an individual's psychological response to the climate change challenge.

See also

 Barriers to pro-environmental behaviour
 Effects of climate change on human health
 Effects of climate change on mental health
 Politics of climate change
 Psychological impact of discrimination on health

Notes

References

Further reading
 Romero, Rex.  "Myclimate." Myclimate, https://www.myclimate.org/information/faq/faq-detail/what-are-the-effects-of-climate-change/ (Links to an external site.).
 Anderson, Judith. "Coping and Defences." Climate Psychology Alliance, 21 Apr. 2021, https://www.climatepsychologyalliance.org/handbook/304-coping-and-defences.
 "What If Global Temperatures Rose by 4 Degrees Celsius?" by klem@s is licensed under CC BY-NC-ND 2.0
 "Human brain illustrated with millions of small nerves" by Ars Electronica is licensed under CC BY-NC-ND 2.0

External links
 How to transform apocalypse fatigue into action on global warming , TED Talk by Per Espen Stoknes on overcoming defensive psychological impacts
 Climate Psychologists
How to shift your mindset and chose your future, TED Talk on 'stuborn optimism' by Tom Rivett-Carnac
Climate Psychiatry Alliance

Environmental psychology
Climate change and society